Charlemont is a suburb of Geelong, Victoria, Australia. At the 2021 census, Charlemont had a population of 2,612, growing from 364 taken at the 2016 census. It was gazetted in February 2012 as part of the Armstrong Creek Growth Area, from largely undeveloped land which had formerly been part of  Grovedale and Marshall.

The Charlemont Rise residential development in the suburb contains several streets named after characters and locations from the Game of Thrones television series and George R. R. Martin's A Song of Ice and Fire novels on which the series is based.

References

Suburbs of Geelong